Guzhang County  is a county of Hunan Province, China. The county is the 2nd least populous administrative unit of the counties or county-level cities (after Shaoshan City) in the province, it is under the administration of Xiangxi Autonomous Prefecture.

Located in the northwest of Hunan and in the east of Xiangxi Prefecture, the county is bordered to the north by Yongshun County, to the east by Yuanling County, to the south by Luxi County and Jishou City, to the west by Baojing County. The county has 7 towns under its jurisdiction, the county seat is Guyang.

Ethnic groups
Guzhang County includes the following ethnic groups (Wu 2007, 2010).
Xiang (}
Miao
Shen Miao: in Shanzhao and Yezhu. Also called "Gelao". Their language is also called Zhang (().
Qian Miao: in Morong and Pingba.

Geology
The Guzhangian Age of the Cambrian Period is named after Guzhang County. In particular, the Louyixi Global boundary Stratotype Section and Point is named after the Louyixi Town in Guzhang County.

Climate

References

External links 

 
County-level divisions of Hunan
Xiangxi Tujia and Miao Autonomous Prefecture